L&L may refer to:
L&L Hawaiian Barbecue
 Land&Liberty, a magazine published by the Henry George Foundation of Great Britain
Loyens & Loeff, a Dutch law firm
Lynx and Lamb Gaede, an American white nationalist pop pre-teen duo
Luke and Laura, fictional characters from the American TV drama General Hospital